Castagnola's was a historical restaurant in San Francisco, California, in the city’s Fisherman’s Wharf at 286 Jefferson Street. The restaurant was famous for its crab cocktail. It was the oldest restaurant on the Wharf.

History
After founder Thomaso Castagnola introduced the crab cocktail at the Panama–California Exposition, he opened the first crab stand on Fisherman's Wharf in 1916, selling fresh crab to passersby. He and his family owned and operated the restaurant until it was sold in 1975.

Andrew Lolli, a retired U.S. Army general, purchased the restaurant from the Castagnolas. He ran the restaurant as a family business until his death in 2006. It remained in the family when his stepdaughters took over. Lolli temporarily closed the restaurant in 2001 after a labor dispute caused them to try to sell the lease.

References

External links
 https://web.archive.org/web/20161103184931/http://castagnolas.com/

1916 establishments in California
Fisherman's Wharf, San Francisco
Restaurants in San Francisco
Restaurants established in 1916
Seafood restaurants in California